The Rivière Bec-Scie is a tributary of the Gulf of Saint Lawrence, flowing in the municipality of L'Île-d'Anticosti, in the Minganie Regional County Municipality, in the administrative region of Côte-Nord, in province of Quebec, in Canada.

The Bec-Scie river turns out to be the last river flowing south in the western part of the island before the territory of SÉPAQ Anticosti.

The main forest road (east-west) of Anticosti Island serves the upper part of this valley. A network of secondary roads connect to this main road, as well as to the west to a forest road network for forestry purposes.

Forestry is the main economic activity in this area; recreational tourism activities, second.

Geography 
The Bec-Scie river has its source at Lake Valiquette located in the western part of Anticosti Island. The mouth of Lake Valiquette is located at the end of the southern bay, at:
  northeast of the town center of the village of Port-Menier;
  south of the north shore of Anticosti Island;
  north of the south shore of Anticosti Island.

From its source, the Bec-Scie River flows south between La Petite Rivière (located on the west side); and the Baleine stream and the Sainte-Marie River (located on the east side).

  south relatively in a straight line, first passing under the bridge of the main road (east–west direction) of the island and crossing on  the north-western part of Faure lake or the main body of water in this valley, up to its mouth;
  towards the southwest to a bend in the river, corresponding to a stream (coming from the north);
  south first, winding through an area of marshland, and crossing Lac Sans Bout, up to its mouth;
  towards the south, first passing under the forest road bridge and forming a few serpentines, collecting in the marsh area the discharge (coming from the northwest) of some marshes and lakes including Castor Lake, then passing under the forest road bridge, to its mouth.

Toponymy 

The toponymic designation "Bec-Scie" refers to Mergus, a genus of fish-eating ducks whose French common name is harle. This toponym has been in use since at least 1924.

It was made official on April 2, 1981, at the "Banque des noms de lieux" (Bank of place names) of Commission de toponymie du Québec.

See also 
Minganie Regional County Municipality
L'Île-d'Anticosti, a municipality
Anticosti Island, an island
Gulf of Saint Lawrence
List of rivers of Quebec

References

External links 

Rivers of Côte-Nord
Anticosti Island
Minganie Regional County Municipality